Inverurie in Aberdeenshire was a royal burgh that returned one commissioner to the Parliament of Scotland and to the Convention of Estates.

After the Acts of Union 1707, Banff, Cullen, Elgin, Inverurie and Kintore comprised the Elgin district of burghs, electing one Member of Parliament between them to the House of Commons of Great Britain.

List of burgh commissioners

 1669–74: James Elphinstone 
 1681–82, 1685–86, 1689 (convention), 1689–93: John Anderson, baillie (declared ineligible 1693) 
 1693–1702: Robert Forbes, advocate 
 1702–07: Sir Robert Forbes of Learnie

References

See also
 List of constituencies in the Parliament of Scotland at the time of the Union

Burghs represented in the Parliament of Scotland (to 1707)
Constituencies disestablished in 1707
History of Aberdeenshire
Politics of the county of Aberdeen
1707 disestablishments in Scotland
Inverurie